Nawalewadi is a village in Ahmednagar district, Maharashtra, India.

Villages in Ahmednagar district